San Juan College is a public community college in Farmington, New Mexico. Founded in 1956 as a branch of the New Mexico College of Agriculture and Mechanical Arts, San Juan College became an independent community college following a county election in 1981.

Awards
In 2011, the San Juan College branch of the American Indian Science and Engineering Society earned the National Student Chapter of the Year award, and is the first community college to earn the national award formerly given at top schools such as Stanford University and the University of California, Los Angeles.

Campuses 
Main Campus, Farmington, New Mexico
30th Street Education Center, Farmington, New Mexico
East Campus, Aztec, New Mexico
West Campus, Kirtland, New Mexico
800 S. Hutton Street Complex, Farmington, New Mexico

Dual-credit program 
San Juan College offers a dual-credit program to high school students who wish to earn college credits while they are still in high school. This program serves seven public school districts in Northwestern New Mexico, as well as nearby private and home-schooled students. Public school students do not pay for tuition and supplies (textbooks, etc.) as they are waived by the state. The San Juan College High school program is along the same lines. Districts across San Juan County send up to ten students to attend, where they earn their associates degree along with a high school diploma.

References

External links

Detailed statistics from the U.S Department of Education's National Center for Educational Statistics (NCES) Integrated Post-secondary Education Data System (IPES)

Farmington, New Mexico
Buildings and structures in San Juan County, New Mexico
Education in San Juan County, New Mexico
Community colleges in New Mexico
Educational institutions established in 1956
1956 establishments in New Mexico